Jabulani Dube (died May 29, 2013) was a Zimbabwean politician. He was the MP-elect for Insiza South.

References

Year of birth missing
2013 deaths
Zimbabwean politicians